Rip It Up and Start Again: Postpunk 1978–1984 is a book by Simon Reynolds on the post-punk musical genre and era. It was first released in the UK in April 2005 by Faber & Faber. The US edition was published by Penguin Books and released in February 2006. It is a shorter version, with several chapters either removed or condensed, and without the large number of illustrations in the UK edition. Reynolds notes this was for space and cost reasons.

Reception 
Writing for The Guardian, Nicholas Lezard described the book as "startlingly thoughtful, gracefully illuminating, in command of an anarchic subject," writing that "Reynolds has reilluminated the period for us, shown us how fascinating and rewarding it was." The Observer described the book as "a compelling reminder of a time when clever, mischievous, creative people formed bands". The New York Times called it "exhaustive and exhausting in equal measure."

In 2006, it was also subject to criticism by writer Clinton Heylin in a book on a similar subject: "Here [is] post-punk - at least before Simon Reynolds decided it was All The Music That I Liked When I Was Young, a somewhat broad not to say solipsistic, view of pop". Alex Ogg of The Quietus noted that Reynolds was frank in his musical choices: "Reynolds was honest enough in announcing his solipsism, in so far as Rip It Up addresses those elements of post-punk that appeal to him".

Editions
UK edition: Reynolds, Simon. Rip It Up and Start Again: Postpunk 1978–1984. London: Faber & Faber, 2005. 
US edition: Reynolds, Simon. Rip It Up and Start Again: Postpunk 1978–1984. London: Penguin Books, 2006.

References

External links 
 Full text available at Internet Archive
 Excerpts from the 2009 edition on Google Books
 Rip It Up and Start Again Footnotes blog chapter by chapter footnotes

2006 non-fiction books
Faber and Faber books
Post-punk